The fifth New Zealand Parliament was a term of the New Zealand Parliament.

Elections for this term were held in 68 European electorates between 14 January and 23 February 1871. Elections in the four Māori electorates were held on 1 and 15 January 1871. A total of 78 MPs were elected. Parliament was prorogued in December 1875. During the term of this Parliament, six Ministries were in power.

Sessions

The fifth Parliament opened on 14 August 1871, following the 1871 general election. It sat for five sessions, and was prorogued on 6 December 1875.

Historical context
Political parties had not been established yet; this only happened after the 1890 election. Anyone attempting to form an administration thus had to win support directly from individual MPs. This made first forming, and then retaining a government difficult and challenging.

Ministries
Since June 1869, the third Fox Ministry was in power, led by Premier William Fox. On 10 September 1872, the third Stafford Ministry was formed, which lasted 13 months. This was followed by the Waterhouse Ministry, from 11 October 1872 to 3 March 1873. The fourth Fox Ministry was short lived, from 3 March 1873 to 8 April 1873. The first Vogel Ministry was in power from 8 April 1873 to 6 July 1875. It was succeeded by the Pollen Ministry, which lasted into the term of the sixth Parliament.

Initial composition of the fifth Parliament
78 seats were created across the electorates. 68 European electorates and 4 Māori electorates were defined by the Representation Act 1870. Six of the general electorates had two representatives, the rest were single member electorates. Hence, 78 MPs were elected.

This compares to 61 electorates used in the previous general election in 1866, and 65 electorates after the Māori electorates were created in 1867.

Changes during term
There were numerous changes during the term of the fifth Parliament.

Akaroa
Robert Heaton Rhodes resigned on 18 February 1874. William Montgomery won the subsequent 24 April 1874 by-election. In July 1874, a select committee declared Montgomery's election to be "null and void", as he had a contract for the supply of railway sleepers with the general government in breach of election rules. The select committee accepted that the breach was inadvertent. Montgomery stood for re-election in a 10 August 1874 by-election and was returned unopposed.

Caversham
Richard Cantrell resigned on 31 July 1872. He was succeeded by William Tolmie in a 28 August 1872 by-election, and he served until his death on 8 August 1875. Robert Stout, a later Prime Minister, first entered Parliament through the resulting 20 August 1875 by-election.

Coleridge
John Karslake Karslake resigned on 12 April 1872 to return to England (he drowned on the voyage home on 21 June 1872). William Bluett succeeded him through the 22 July 1872 by-election.

Collingwood
Arthur Collins resigned on 8 October 1873. The resulting 9 December 1873 by-election was won by William Gibbs.

City of Dunedin
Bathgate resigned in 1874 and was succeeded by Nathaniel Wales.

City of Nelson
Lightband resigned in 1872 to return to England. He was succeeded by David Luckie.

Egmont
Gisborne resigned in 1872 and was succeeded by Harry Atkinson.

Franklin
Clark resigned in 1874 and was succeeded by Joseph May.

Notes

References

05